Westringia is a genus of Australian shrubs. As with other members of the mint family their upper petal (or lip) is divided into two lobes. There are four stamens - the upper two are fertile while the lower two are reduced to staminodes. The leaves are in whorls of 3 or 4.

Distribution
Westringia has been found in the wild in all 6 states of Australia, as well as on Norfolk Island, but not in the Northern Territory.

Species list
The following is a list of the species of Westringia described and recognised by the World Checklist of Selected Plant Families at Kew Gardens

Westringia acifolia G.R.Guerin (W.A.)
Westringia amabilis B.Boivin (N.S.W., Qld.)
Westringia angustifolia R.Br. - scabrous westringia (Tas.)
Westringia blakeana B.Boivin - Blake's mint-bush
Westringia brevifolia Benth.  - greater shortleaf westringia
Westringia capitonia G.R.Guerin
Westringia cephalantha F.Muell. 
Westringia cheelii Maiden & Betche 
Westringia crassifolia N.A.Wakef. - whipstick westringia (Vic.)
Westringia cremnophila N.A.Wakef. - Snowy River westringia (Vic.)
Westringia dampieri R.Br. - shore westringia (W.A.)
Westringia davidii B.J.Conn - David's westringia
Westringia discipulorum S.Moore - white  button bush 
Westringia eremicola A.Cunn. ex Benth. - slender westringia 
Westringia fitzgeraldensis R.W.Davis & Jobson
Westringia fruticosa (Willd.) Druce - coastal rosemary 
Westringia glabra R.Br. - violet westringia 
Westringia grandifolia Benth. 
Westringia kydrensis B.J.Conn - Kydra westringia
Westringia longepedunculata B.Boivin 
Westringia longifolia R.Br. - long-leaved westringia 
Westringia lucida B.Boivin - shining westringia 
Westringia lurida Gand.
Westringia ophioglossa R.W.Davis & Jobson
Westringia parvifolia C.T.White & W.D.Francis 
Westringia rigida R.Br. - stiff westringia 
Westringia rubiifolia R.Br. - sticky westringia
Westringia rupicola S.T.Blake 
Westringia saxatilis B.J.Conn  
Westringia senifolia F.Muell. - alpine westringia 
Westringia sericea B.Boivin - silky rosemary; native rosemary
Westringia tenuicaulis C.T.White & W.D.Francis - tufted westringia
Westringia viminalis B.J.Conn & Tozer - Lord Howe westringia

References

External links

 NSW Flora Online - Westringia

 
Endemic flora of Australia
Lamiaceae genera
Taxa named by James Edward Smith